Cisthene or Kisthene was a town of ancient Lycia.

Its site is unlocated, but likely on the central Lycian coast.

References

Populated places in ancient Lycia
Former populated places in Turkey
Lost ancient cities and towns